Manasaul is a rural locality (a selo) and the administrative centre of Manasaulsky Selsoviet, Buynaksky District, Republic of Dagestan, Russia. The population was 629 as of 2010. There are 22 streets.

Geography 
Manasaul is located 13 km southwest of Buynaksk (the district's administrative centre) by road, on the left bank of the Akleozen River. Agachkala is the nearest rural locality.

References 

Rural localities in Buynaksky District